Andrew County is a county located in the northwestern part of the U.S. state of Missouri. As of the 2020 census, the county had a population of 18,135. Its county seat is Savannah. The county was organized January 29, 1841, and named for Andrew Jackson Davis, a lawyer and prominent citizen of St. Louis.

Andrew County is part of the St. Joseph, MOKS Metropolitan Statistical Area, which is included in the Kansas City-Overland Park-Kansas City Combined statistical area.

History
The following material is inscribed on a plaque erected by the State Historical Society of Missouri and State Highway Commission in 1960, now located by the Andrew County Courthouse:

Andrew County, organized 1841, is one of six counties in the Indian Platte Purchase Territory annexed to Missouri in 1837. Named for Andrew Jackson Davis, a St. Louis editor, the county was first settled in the middle 1830s. Pioneers were from Ohio, Indiana, Tennessee, Kentucky, Virginia, and other parts of Missouri.

Savannah, the county seat, was laid out in 1841. First briefly called Union, it was renamed for Savannah, Georgia.  The Platte County Railroad (CB&Q) reached there in 1860, and today's Chicago, Great Western in the late 1880s. The town grew as a shipping point and trading center in the post Civil War era.

Divided during the Civil War, Andrew County sent troops to both sides.  In August 1861, 1,500 soldiers from Andrew County and other counties joined the pro-Southern Missouri State Guard at Camp Highly in eastern Andrew County while others joined a large Union cap in adjacent Gentry County.  In 1861, Union troops seized "Northwest Democrat," a pro-Southern newspaper, in Savannah and troops from Camp Highly seized the "Plain Dealer," a Union newspaper.  Raiding guerrilla bands overran the county through 1863.

Andrew County's glacial plains support fertile livestock, grain, and fruit farms. The One Hundred and Two River, along with the Platte River, are located in the county.  Its western border is formed by the Nodaway and Missouri rivers. In 1804 the Lewis and Clark Expedition camped on an island at the mouth of the Nodaway River.  Members of fur trader W. Price Hunt's 1811 Astorian expedition wintered near the river's mouth as well.

Among the towns located in Andrew County are Amazonia, once on the Missouri River, now inland, laid out in 1857 near the site of Nodaway City, an early river port; Fillmore, established in 1845; Whitesville, established in 1848; Rochester, established in 1848; Bolckow, established in 1868; Rosendale, established in 1869; Rea, established in 1877; Helena, established in 1878; and Cosby, established in 1882.

The Andrew County Museum & Historical Society celebrates the history of Andrew County through exhibits, programs, publications, and special events. The museum and society collects, preserves, researches, and interprets documents and artifacts to promote the appreciation and preservation of the county's history and bring history to life in Andrew County.

Geography

Adjacent counties
Nodaway County  (north)
Gentry County  (northeast)
DeKalb County  (east)
Buchanan County  (south)
Doniphan County, Kansas  (southwest)
Holt County  (west)

Major highways
 Interstate 29
 Interstate 229
 U.S. Route 59
 U.S. Route 71
 U.S. Route 169
 Route 48

Demographics

As of the census of 2000, there were 16,492 people, 6,273 households, and 4,635 families residing in the county.  The population density was 38 people per square mile (15/km2).  There were 6,662 housing units at an average density of 15 per square mile (6/km2).  The racial makeup of the county was 98.38% White, 0.42% Black or African American, 0.34% Native American, 0.22% Asian, 0.01% Pacific Islander, 0.18% from other races, and 0.45% from two or more races. Approximately 0.84% of the population were Hispanic or Latino of any race.

There were 6,273 households, out of which 34.50% had children under the age of 18 living with them, 62.70% were married couples living together, 7.40% had a female householder with no husband present, and 26.10% were non-families. 22.30% of all households were made up of individuals, and 10.50% had someone living alone who was 65 years of age or older.  The average household size was 2.59 and the average family size was 3.03.

In the county, the population was spread out, with 26.40% under the age of 18, 7.90% from 18 to 24, 27.60% from 25 to 44, 23.70% from 45 to 64, and 14.40% who were 65 years of age or older.  The median age was 38 years. For every 100 females, there were 95.00 males.  For every 100 females age 18 and over, there were 93.00 males.

The median income for a household in the county was $40,688, and the median income for a family was $46,067. Males had a median income of $32,955 versus $22,586 for females. The per capita income for the county was $19,375.  About 6.40% of families and 8.20% of the population were below the poverty line, including 10.50% of those under age 18 and 8.00% of those age 65 or over.

Religion
According to the Association of Religion Data Archives County Membership Report (2010), Andrew County is sometimes regarded as being on the northern edge of the Bible Belt, with evangelical Protestantism being the most predominant religion. The most predominant denominations among residents in Andrew County who adhere to a religion are Southern Baptists (38.62%), United Methodists (21.14%), and Disciples of Christ (9.86%).

2020 census

Education

Public schools
Avenue City R-IX School District – Cosby
Avenue City Elementary School (PK-08)
North Andrew County R-VI School District – Rosendale
North Andrew County Elementary School (K-05)
North Andrew County Middle School (06-08)
North Andrew County High School (09-12)
Savannah R-III School District – Savannah
Amazonia Elementary School (K-05)
Helena Elementary School (K-05)
John Glenn Elementary School (K-05)
Minnie Cline Elementary School (PK-05)
Savannah Middle School (06-08)
Savannah High School (09-12)

Public libraries
Rolling Hills Consolidated Library—Savannah Branch

Politics

Local
Republicans control politics at the local level in Andrew County. They hold every elected position in the county.

State

All of Andrew County is a part of Missouri's 9th District in the Missouri House of Representatives and is represented by Dean Van Schoiack (R-Savannah).

All of Andrew County is a part of Missouri's 12th District in the Missouri Senate and is currently represented by Dan Hegemen (R-Cosby).

Federal
All of Andrew County is included in Missouri's 6th Congressional District and is currently represented by Sam Graves (R-Tarkio) in the U.S. House of Representatives. Graves was elected to an eleventh term in 2020 over Democratic challenger Gena Ross.

Andrew County, along with the rest of the state of Missouri, is represented in the U.S. Senate by Josh Hawley (R-Columbia) and Roy Blunt (R-Strafford).

Blunt was elected to a second term in 2016 over then-Missouri Secretary of State Jason Kander.

Political culture

At the presidential level, Andrew County is solidly Republican. Andrew County strongly favored Donald Trump in both 2016 and 2020. Bill Clinton was the last Democratic presidential nominee to carry Andrew County in 1992 with a plurality of the vote, and a Democrat hasn't won majority support from the county's voters in a presidential election since Lyndon Johnson in 1964.

Like most rural areas throughout northwest Missouri, voters in Andrew County generally adhere to socially and culturally conservative principles which tend to influence their Republican leanings. Despite Andrew County's longstanding tradition of supporting socially conservative platforms, voters in the county have a penchant for advancing populist causes. In 2018, Missourians voted on a proposition (Proposition A) concerning right to work, the outcome of which ultimately reversed the right to work legislation passed in the state the previous year. 67.18% of Andrew County voters cast their ballots to overturn the law.

Missouri presidential preference primaries

2020
The 2020 presidential primaries for both the Democratic and Republican parties were held in Missouri on March 10. On the Democratic side, former Vice President Joe Biden (D-Delaware) both won statewide and carried Andrew County by a wide margin. Biden went on to defeat President Donald Trump in the general election.

Incumbent President Donald Trump (R-Florida) faced a primary challenge from former Massachusetts Governor Bill Weld, but won both Andrew County and statewide by large margins.

2016
The 2016 presidential primaries for both the Republican and Democratic parties were held in Missouri on March 15. Businessman Donald Trump (R-New York) narrowly won the state and Andrew County. He went on to win the presidency.

On the Democratic side, Senator Bernie Sanders (I-Vermont) won Andrew County, but former Secretary of State Hillary Clinton (D-New York) won statewide by a small margin.

2012
The 2012 Missouri Republican Presidential Primary's results were nonbinding on the state's national convention delegates. Voters in Andrew County supported former U.S. Senator Rick Santorum (R-Pennsylvania), who finished first in the state at large, but eventually lost the nomination to former Governor Mitt Romney (R-Massachusetts). Delegates to the congressional district and state conventions were chosen at a county caucus, which selected a delegation favoring Santorum. Incumbent President Barack Obama easily won the Missouri Democratic Primary and renomination. He defeated Romney in the general election.

2008
In 2008, the Missouri Republican Presidential Primary was closely contested, with Senator John McCain (R-Arizona) prevailing and eventually winning the nomination. However, former Governor Mitt Romney (R-Massachusetts) carried Andrew County

Then-Senator Hillary Clinton (D-New York) received more votes than any candidate from either party in Andrew County during the 2008 presidential primary. Despite initial reports that Clinton had won Missouri, Barack Obama (D-Illinois), also a Senator at the time, narrowly defeated her statewide and later became that year's Democratic nominee, going on to win the presidency.

Communities

Cities
Bolckow
Fillmore
Rea
Rosendale
Savannah (county seat)
Saint Joseph (Partial)

Villages
Amazonia
Cosby
Country Club

Unincorporated communities

 Avenue City
 Flag Springs
 Fountainbleau
 Helena
 Kodiak
 Nodaway
 Rankin
 Rochester
 Whitesville
 Wythe

Townships
Andrew County is divided into 10 townships:

 Benton
 Clay
 Empire
 Jackson
 Jefferson
 Lincoln
 Monroe
 Nodaway
 Platte
 Rochester

Notable people

Nellie Tayloe Ross, the first female Governor of Wyoming (1925-1927) and first elected female Governor of any state in the United States, as well as the first female director of the U.S. Mint
Joseph K. Toole (1851-1929), the first Governor of Montana and member of the Democratic Party
John P. Altgeld, Governor of Illinois from 1893 to 1897, lived in Savannah
Eminem, American rapper, lived in Savannah and attended middle school there

See also
National Register of Historic Places listings in Andrew County, Missouri

References

External links
 Digitized 1930 Plat Book of Andrew County  from University of Missouri Division of Special Collections, Archives, and Rare Books

 
1841 establishments in Missouri
Missouri counties
St. Joseph, Missouri metropolitan area
Missouri counties on the Missouri River